Swine is a village and civil parish in the East Riding of Yorkshire, England.

The place-name 'Swine' is first attested in the Domesday Book of 1086, where it appears as Swine. It appears as Suine in a charter of circa 1150. The name perhaps derives from the Old English swin meaning 'creek'.

In about 1625, Anne Gargill, an early Quaker writer was born here.

The civil parish of Swine consists of the village of Swine and the hamlet of Benningholme. According to the 2011 UK census, Swine parish had a population of 139, a decrease on the 2001 UK census figure of 143.

The Priory Church of St Mary the Virgin was designated a Grade I listed building in 1966 and is now recorded in the National Heritage List for England, maintained by Historic England.

Swine was served from 1864 to 1964 by Swine railway station on the Hull and Hornsea Railway.

Two miles south-west of the village are the earthwork remains of the medieval Swine Castle that is a Scheduled Ancient Monument.

References

External links

Villages in the East Riding of Yorkshire
Holderness
Civil parishes in the East Riding of Yorkshire